WALE-LD (channel 17) is a low-power local weather television station in Montgomery, Alabama, United States. It is owned by Woods Communications Corporation alongside Fox affiliate WCOV-TV (channel 20) and Troy-licensed Cozi TV affiliate WIYC (channel 48). The stations share studios on WCOV Avenue in the Normandale section of Montgomery, where WALE-LD's transmitter is also located.

On December 15, 2021, it was announced that Allen Media Group, a subsidiary of Los Angeles-based Entertainment Studios, would purchase WALE-LD, WCOV-TV and WIYC for $28.5 million, pending approval of the Federal Communications Commission (FCC); at the time, the deal was expected to close in the first half of 2022.

At some point in 2022, the station dropped True Crime Network from its main channel and switched to a 24-hour local weather format, known as the Montgomery Weather Channel.

Subchannels
The station's digital signal is multiplexed:

References

External links
Official website

True Crime Network affiliates
Laff (TV network) affiliates
Ion Mystery affiliates
Movies! affiliates
Heroes & Icons affiliates
Comet (TV network) affiliates
ALE-LD
Television channels and stations established in 2015
2015 establishments in Alabama
Low-power television stations in the United States